Andrew Frisardi is an American writer, translator, and independent scholar.

He is a Fellow of and frequent lecturer at Temenos Academy, in London, which offers adult education in philosophy and the arts in the light of the sacred traditions of East and West. He also frequently contributes poems, essays, translations, and reviews to the Academy's journal, Temenos Academy Review.

Frisardi's poems, translations, and essays, and reviews have appeared in numerous U.S. magazines and journals, including the Atlantic Monthly, Hudson Review, Kenyon Review, New Criterion, New Republic, New Yorker; as well as various anthologies.

He was awarded a Guggenheim Fellowship in 2013 for his work on a new annotated translation of Dante's Convivio.

In 2004 he was awarded the Academy of American Poets Raiziss/de Palchi Translation Award book prize for The Selected Poems of Giuseppe Ungaretti.

Books
  Poems.
 
  Annotated translation of Dante's Convivio. 
  Essays.
 Brian Keeble,  
  Poems.
  Essays.
  Annotated translation of Dante's Vita Nuova.
  Selected translations from the Milanese dialect poet Franco Loi. 
  Translation of the modernist Italian poet Giuseppe Ungaretti.

References

External links
Academy of American Poets
John Simon Guggenheim Memorial Foundation
 Lecture at Temenos Academy (November 2018) on Dante's ideas about nobility The Seed of Nobility by Andrew Frisardi
 Helen Vendler reviews Andrew Frisardi's annotated edition of Dante's Vita Nova Dante's Vita Nova New Republic, October 5, 2012.
 Discussion of Vendler review JISCMail - ITALIAN-STUDIES Archives - October 2012 at Italian studies listserv, JISCMail
 Poems at Verse Daily: Andrew Frisardi Verse Daily;May Day black locust by Andrew Frisardi New Criterion; Unsplendid | An Online Journal of Poetry in Received and Nonce Forms Unsplendid; and the Junior Soccer - 96.11 Atlantic Monthly
 Giuseppe Ungaretti, "Variations on Nothing," translated by Andrew Frisardi, from Giuseppe Ungaretti: Selected Poems, at Variations On Nothing Poem by Giuseppe Ungaretti. - Poem Hunter Poem Hunter
 Franco Loi translations at The Chimaera, January 2008: Andrew Frisardi The Chimera, with an essay on Loi and dialect poetry

American male poets
Italian–English translators
Living people
Writers from Boston
Syracuse University alumni
Year of birth missing (living people)